The 1990 Meath Intermediate Football Championship is the 64th edition of the Meath GAA's premier club Gaelic football tournament for intermediate graded teams in County Meath, Ireland. The tournament consists of 20 teams. The championship starts with a group stage and then progresses to a knock out stage.

This was St. Peter's Dunboyne's return to the grade as they were promoted from the J.F.C. after claiming the 1989 Meath Junior Football Championship title, and they almost won straight promotion through the grade, losing to Dunderry in the final.

On 14 October 1990, Dunderry claimed their 4th Intermediate championship title when they defeated St. Peter's Dunboyne 0–16 to 1–7 in the final at Pairc Tailteann, ending their run of 3 final losses in 3 years.

Wolfe Tones were regraded to the J.F.C. for 1991 after over 10 years as an Intermediate club.

Team changes

The following teams have changed division since the 1989 championship season.

From I.F.C.
Promoted to S.F.C.
 St. Michael's  -  (Intermediate Champions)

Relegated to J.A.F.C.
 Duleek
 Ratoath

To I.F.C.
Regraded from S.F.C.
 None

Promoted from J.A.F.C.
 St. Peter's Dunboyne - (Junior 'A' Champions)

Group stage
There are 4 groups called Group A, B, C and D. The top two finishers in all groups will qualify for the quarter finals.

Group A

Round 1:
 Ballinabrackey 3-11, 0-5 Ballivor, Summerhill, 5/5/1990,
 St. Mary's 2-15, 1-8 Martry Harps, Seneschalstown, 6/5/1990,
 Bellewstown - Bye,

Round 2:
 St. Mary's 4-9, 1-6 Bellewstown, Skryne, 20/5/1990,
 Martry Harps 2-11, 1-7 Ballivor, Athboy, 20/5/1990,
 Ballinabrackey - Bye,

Round 3:
 Ballinabrackey 2-11, 1-9 Bellewstown, Dunshaughlin, 27/5/1990,
 St. Mary's w, l Ballivor, 
 Martry Harps - Bye,

Round 4:
 Bellewstown 1-8, 1-7 Martry Harps, Dunshaughlin, 16/6/1990,
 Ballinabrackey 2-8, 1-7 St. Mary's, Dunderry, 16/6/1990,
 Ballivor - Bye,

Round 5:
 Bellewstown w/o, scr Ballivor,
 Ballinabrackey w/o, scr Martry Harps,
 St. Mary's - Bye

Group B

Round 1:
 Rathkenny 0–8, 0-8 Moynalty, Kells, 5/5/1990,
 Dunderry 2-12, 1-12 St. Patrick's, Skryne, 13/5/1990,
 Athboy - Bye,

Round 2:
 Dunderry w, l Athboy, Kells, 1/8/1990,
 Moynalty 0-14, 1-7 St. Patrick's, Seneschalstown, 1/8/1990,
 Rathkenny - Bye,

Round 3:
 Dunderry 0-16, 1-8 Moynalty, Cortown, 17/6/1990,
 Athboy w, l Rathkenny, 
 St. Patrick's - Bye,

Round 4:
 St. Patrick's 1-13, 2-7 Athboy, Skryne, 16/6/1990,
 Rathkenny 2-8, 0-10 Dunderry, Seneschalstown, 8/7/1990,
 Moynalty - Bye,

Round 5:
 Moynalty 0–11, 0-11 Athboy, Kells, 8/7/1990,
 Rathkenny 0–9, 0-9 St. Patrick's, Seneschalstown, 31/7/1990,
 Dunderry - Bye

Quarter-Final Playoff:
 Rathkenny 0-12, 0-11 Moynalty, Carlanstown, 14/8/1990,

Group C

Round 1:
 St. Peter's Dunboyne 1-19, 0-3 Wolfe Tones, Dunshaughlin, 13/5/1990,
 Donaghmore 1-11, 1-8 Kilmainhamwood, Seneschalstown, 12/5/1990,
 Meath Hill - Bye,

Round 2:
 Donaghmore 0-12, 0-6 Meath Hill, Seneschalstown, 20/5/1990,
 Kilmainhamwood 3-9, 1-4 Wolfe Tones, Kells, 20/5/1990,
 St. Peter's Dunboyne - Bye,

Round 3:
 Donaghmore 0–5, 0-5 Wolfe Tones, Skryne, 26/5/1990,
 St. Peter's Dunboyne 3-15, 0-2 Meath Hill, Kilberry, 16/6/1990,
 Kilmainhamwood - Bye,

Round 4:
 Kilmainhamwood 0-12, 1-3 Meath Hill, Castletown, 7/7/1990,
 St. Peter's Dunboyne 0-13, 0-6 Donaghmore, Dunshaughlin, 8/7/1990,
 Wolfe Tones - Bye,

Round 5:
 St. Peter's Dunboyne 3-9, 0-8 Kilmainhamwood, Kilberry, 1/8/1990,
 Meath Hill w/o, scr Wolfe Tones,
 Donaghmore - Bye,

Group D

Round 1:
 Dunshaughlin 2-13, 2-9 Dunsany, Skryne, 5/5/1990,
 Ballinlough 2-16, 3-8 Syddan, Carlanstown, 13/5/1990,
 Navan O'Mahonys 'B' - Bye,

Round 2:
 Navan O'Mahonys 'B' w, l Ballinlough,
 Syddan 0–8, 0-8 Dunshaughlin, Kilberry, 20/5/1990,
 Dunsany - Bye,

Round 3:
 Navan O'Mahonys 'B' 1-19, 3-7 Dunsany, Trim, 16/6/1990,
 Ballinlough 2-10, 0-7 Dunshaughlin, Walterstown, 16/6/1990,
 Syddan - Bye,

Round 4:
 Navan O'Mahonys 'B' 1–9, 2-6 Syddan, Rathkenny, 22/6/1990,
 Dunsany 2-4, 0-7 Ballinlough, Pairc Tailteann, 17/7/1990,
 Dunshaughlin - Bye,

Round 5:
 Navan O'Mahonys 'B' 1-14, 0-10 Dunshaughlin, ???, 8/7/1990,
 Dunsany 1-9, 1-8 Syddan, Seneschalstown, 20/7/1990,
 Ballinlough - Bye,

Quarter-Final Playoff:
 Ballinlough 4-11, 1-7 Dunsany, Athboy, 1/8/1990,

Knock-out Stages

Finals
The teams in the quarter-finals are the top two finishers from each group.

Quarter Final:
 St. Mary's 1-11, 0-7 Navan O'Mahonys 'B', Seneschalstown, 2/8/1990,
 St. Peter's Dunboyne 1-12, 0-8 Rathkenny, Pairc Tailteann, 25/8/1990,
 Ballinabrackey 1-11, 1-7 Ballinlough, Pairc Tailteann, 26/8/1990,
 Dunderry 5-10, 0-7 Donaghmore, ???, 23/9/1990,

Semi Final:
 Dunderry 2-18, 1-3 Ballinabrackey, Pairc Tailteann, 30/9/1990,
 St. Peter's Dunboyne 2-20, 1-2 St. Mary's, Pairc Tailteann, 30/9/1990,

Final:
 Dunderry 0-16, 1-7 St. Peter's Dunboyne, Pairc Tailteann, 14/10/1990,

References

External links

Meath Intermediate Football Championship
Meath Intermediate Football Championship